The Lord Warden of the Cinque Ports is a ceremonial official in the United Kingdom. The post dates from at least the 12th century, when the title was Keeper of the Coast, but may be older. The Lord Warden was originally in charge of the Cinque Ports, a group of five (cinque in Norman French) port towns on the southeast coast of England that was formed to collectively supply ships for The Crown in the absence at the time of a formal navy. Today the role is a sinecure and an honorary title, and fourteen towns belong to the Cinque Ports confederation. The title is one of the higher honours bestowed by the Sovereign; it has often been held by members of the Royal Family or prime ministers, especially those who have been influential in defending Britain at times of war.

The Lord Warden was solely responsible for the return of all writs to the Crown, along with the collection of taxes and the arrest of criminals. His court was held in St James's church, near Dover Castle, and there he exercised jurisdiction broadly equivalent to that of Chancery. He also had a "lieutenant's powers of muster", and the Constableship of Dover Castle, later added (1267) to the warden's office, enabled him to keep a garrison and administrative staff, including the clerk and the lieutenant of the castle.

The coat of arms of the Cinque Ports first appeared in 1305, second amongst the earliest English known heraldic emblems, predating even the coat of arms of the City of London. The coat of arms of the Cinque Ports displays three ships' hulls and three lions passant guardant conjoined to these hulls, all in gold. These may originally have been Gules three lions passant gardant in pale Or (for England) dimidiating Gules three ships' hulks in pale Or. The coat of arms of the Confederation of the Cinque Ports is set out on a red and blue background and traditionally represents the fourteen "corporate" members.

Creation and appointment of the Lord Warden
The creation and appointment of the Lord Warden, once among the most powerful appointments of the realm, by the Sovereign was instituted principally after the portsmen sided with the Earl of Leicester against King Henry III, in the Second Barons' War, and was intended to provide some central authority over the Cinque Ports, which were essentially otherwise independent of the King's sheriffs. It was combined from 1267 with the office of Constable of Dover Castle. However, from 1708 Walmer Castle at Deal was to be preferred as the official residence of the Lord Warden of the Cinque Ports. The Lord Warden also holds the office of Admiral of the Cinque Ports with a maritime jurisdiction extending to the middle of the English Channel, from Redcliffe near Seaford, in Sussex to the shore underneath the Naze Tower, encompassing Brightlingsea in Essex, the only Cinque Port north of the Thames. In earlier centuries the northern limit was taken as the Shoe Beacon in Essex.

The courts of Brodhull and Guestling were established to protect the privileges of the Cinque Ports by the portsmen themselves. From the 15th century these courts had been largely replaced by the Lord Warden's Court at Dover. From the 16th century the principal business of the courts was the installation of the Lord Warden and the court is now only occasionally summoned. The office continued to be a powerful one. In 1550 the Mayor and Jurats of Dover refused to accept a Royal Writ because it was not accompanied by a letter of attendance from the Lord Warden. The member ports' parliamentary representatives were appointed by the Lord Warden at first; despite an act passed in 1689 to curb this influence, it continued until the 19th century.

At the installation of a new Lord Warden, the Speaker of the Confederation of the Cinque Ports instructs the Lord Warden: "to undertake the duties of the Ancient and Honourable Office and to uphold the Franchises, Liberties, Customs and Usages of the port."

The office of Speaker has traditionally rotated between the affiliate townships every year dating from at least 1550. Inaugurations are begun on 21 May, and membership is ordained through a longstanding maritime tradition of a principle of the prevailing winds coming from west to east.

A unique uniform is specified for the Lord Warden (though Admiral of the Fleet Michael Boyce, Baron Boyce, whose term ended with his death in 2022, wore his naval uniform in preference). The uniform is very similar to a pre-1956-pattern Admiral's uniform (complete with cocked hat) trimmed in red and with Cinque Ports insignia. Sir Robert Menzies's uniform (pictured), which he wore as Lord Warden from 1966 to 1978, is preserved at the National Library of Australia.

Barons of the Cinque Ports
All freemen of the ports, termed "portsmen", were deemed in the age of feudalism to be barons, and thus members of the baronage entitled to attend the king's parliament. Termed "Barons of the Cinque Ports", they reflected an early concept that military service at sea constituted land tenure per baroniam making them quasi feudal barons. The early 14th-century treatise Modus Tenendi Parliamentum stated the Barons of the Cinque Ports to hold a place of precedence below the lay magnates but above the representatives of the shires and boroughs. Writs of summons to Parliament were sent to the warden following which representative barons of the Cinque Ports were selected to attend parliament. Thus the warden's duty in this respect was similar to that of the sheriff who received the writs for distribution to the barons in the shires. The warden and barons often experienced clashes of jurisdiction. In the 21st century the title "Baron of the Cinque Ports" is now reserved for Freemen elected by the Mayor, Jurats, and Common Council of the Ports to attend a Coronation, and is solely honorary in nature.

List of Lords Warden of the Cinque Ports
The first authoritative list of Cinque Ports Confederation Members was produced in 1293 when Stephen of Pencester was Warden. The Lord Warden of the Cinque Ports is appointed for life, but in the earliest of records this was not the case. The office of Lord Warden of the Cinque Ports has been traced from the year 1226 from the appointment of William de Averanch, although he was not the first incumbent of this office. The longest term of office was that of William Brook, Lord Cobham, who presided at the court for 40 years.

Constable of Dover Castle
Source: The Cinque Ports

Godwine, Earl of Wessex 1045–1053 
Harold Godwine, Earl of Wessex (King Harold II) 1053–1066 
Bertram Ashburnham 1066 
William de Peverell 1066
Odo, Bishop of Bayeux and Earl of Kent 1066–1084 
John de Fiennes 1084–1085 
James de Fiennes (son of John) 1085–1111 
John de Fiennes (son of James) 1111–1138
Walkelin de Magminot 1138 
Prince Eustace of Boulogne (son of King Stephen) 1138–1153
Wakelin de Magminot 1153–1154 
Robert Fitz-Bernard 1154–1169 
Hugo de Mara 1169–1187 
Alan de Valeines (or Valoines) 1187–1190
Matthew de Clere 1190–1195 
William de Wrotham 1195–1201 
Thomas Basset, Lord Hedendon 1201–1202 
Hubert de Burgh, 1st Earl of Kent 1202–1203 
William of Huntingfield 1203–1204 
William de Longespee 1204–1207 
Geoffrey Fitzpier, Earl of Essex 1207–1213 
William Briwere, Lord Torbay 1213–1215 
Hubert de Burgh, 1st Earl of Kent  1215–1220 
Henry de Braibroc 1220 
Robert de Neresford (Hereford) 1221–1223 
Hugh de Windsor 1223 
Stephen Langton, Archbishop of Canterbury 1223–1224 
Geoffery de Lucy, Lord Newington 1224–1225 
Hubert de Hoese (Hose or Hussey) 1225 
Geoffrey de Surland 1225–1226 
William d'Avranches, Lord Folkestone 1226–1227 (also Keeper of the Coast)
Bertram de Criol, 1227 (also Keeper of the Coast)
Hubert de Burgh, 1st Earl of Kent 1227–1232, and Robert de Auberville 1228–1235
Henry de Hoese, Lord Hastings 1232 
Stephen, Lord de Segrave 1232–1235 
Humphrey de Bohun, 3rd Earl of Hereford 1235 
Bertram de Criol 1236
Henry de Hoese (Henry Hussey), Lord Hastings 1236–1241 
Peter de Savoy, Earl of Richmond 1241–1242 (also Keeper of the Coast)
Bertram de Criol 1242–1255 (also Keeper of the Coast)
Reginald de Cobham, 1st Baron Cobham 1256–1258 (also Keeper of the Coast)
Sir Roger Northwode 1258 (also Keeper of the Coast)
Nicholas de Moels, Lord Caddebury 1258 (also Keeper of the Coast)
Richard de Grey, Lord Condor 1258–1259 (also Keeper of the Coast)
Hugh de Bigod 1259–1261 (also Keeper of the Coast)
Robert de Walerand, Lord Kilpek 1261–1262 
Walter de Burgsted (also Keeper of the Coast) 1262 
Robert de Walerand 1263 
Richard de Grey, Lord Codnor 1263 
Prince Edmund (son of Henry III), jointly with Robert de Gascoyne 1263 
Henry of Sandwich, Bishop of London 1263 
John de Haia 1263 
Richard de Grey, Lord Codnor 1263 
Sir Roger de Leybourne 1263–1264 
Henry de Montfort 1264–1265 
Matthew de Hastings 1265 
Sir Roger de Leybourne 1265 
Prince Edward, (King Edward I) 1265–1266 
Sir Matthew de Bezille 1266–1267

Keeper of the Coast
Odo, Bishop of Bayeux, 1066–1084
Henry of Essex c.1150–1154
Henry de Sandwich 1154–1189
Simon de Sandwich 1154–1189
Alan de Fienes 1154–1189
James de Fienes 1189–1199
Matthew de Clere 1189–1199
William Devereux 1189–1199
William Longchamp 1189–1199
William de Wrotham 1189–1199
Thomas Bassett 1199–1216
William de Huntingfield 1199–1216
William de Sarum 1199–1216
Geoffrey FitzPiers 1199–1216
William de Warenne, 5th Earl of Surrey 1204–1206 and 1214
Hubert de Burgh, 1st Earl of Kent 1215–1220
Geoffery de Lucy 1224 (and 1230)
William d'Avranches 1226–1227
Robert de Auberville 1228
Peter de Rivaux 1232–1234
Lord de Segrove
Walerand Teutonicus 1235
Hamo de Crevecoeur 1235
Bertram de Criol 1236 (and intermittently until 1255)
Humphrey de Bohun, 3rd Earl of Hereford 1241
Peter de Savoy 1241
Reginald de Cobham, 1st Baron Cobham 1255
Sir Roger Northwode 1258
Nicholas de Moels 1258
Richard de Grey 1258
Hugh de Bigod 1259–1260
Nicholas de Crioll 1260–1263
Robert de Walerand 1261
Walter de Burgsted 1263
Humphrey de Bohun, 3rd Earl of Hereford c.1264
Edmund Crouchback, 1st Earl of Lancaster (uncertain)
Henry de Sandwich, Bishop of London, 1263
Sir Roger de Leybourne 1263
Henry de Montfort 1264
Matthew de Hastings 1265
Edward "Longshanks", Earl of Chester 1265
Sir Matthew de Bezille 1266

Lord Warden and Constable of Dover Castle (since 1267)
Sir Stephen de Pencester 1267–1271 (then at intervals until 1298, for a total of 32 years)
Sir Simon de Creye 1275 
Robert de Burghersh, 1st Baron Burghersh 1299–1306

14th century
Henry de Cobham, 1st Baron Cobham 1307
Robert de Kendall 1307
Henry de Cobham, 1st Baron Cobham 1315
Bartholomew de Badlesmere, 1st Baron Badlesmere 1320
Hugh le Despenser, 1st Earl of Winchester 1320
Edmund of Woodstock, 1st Earl of Kent 1321
Sir John Peche 1323
Ralph Basset, 2nd Baron Basset of Drayton 1325
Bartholomew de Burghersh, 1st Baron Burghersh 1327
William de Clinton, 1st Earl of Huntingdon 1330
Bartholomew de Burghersh, 1st Baron Burghersh 1348
Roger Mortimer, 2nd Earl of March 1355
John Beauchamp, 3rd Baron Beauchamp 1359
Sir Robert de Herle 1361
Baron Spigurnell 1364
Sir Richard de Pembrugge 1370
Andrew de Guldeford
William Latimer, 4th Baron Latimer 1374
Sir Thomas Reines
Edmund of Langley, Earl of Cambridge 1376
Sir Robert Assheton 1381
Sir Simon de Burley 1384
John Devereux, 1st Baron Devereux 1387
John Beaumont, 4th Baron Beaumont 1392
Edmund of Langley, 1st Duke of York 1396
John Beaufort, 1st Marquess of Dorset 1398
Sir Thomas Erpingham 1399

15th century
Henry "of Monmouth", Prince of Wales 1409
Thomas FitzAlan, 12th Earl of Arundel and 10th Earl of Surrey 1412
Humphrey, Duke of Gloucester 1415
James Fiennes, 1st Baron Saye and Sele 1447
Humphrey Stafford, 1st Duke of Buckingham 1450
Richard, Lord Rivers 1459
Richard Neville, 16th Earl of Warwick 1460
Sir John Scott 1471
William FitzAlan, 16th Earl of Arundel 1483–1488
Philip Fitz Lewes 1488
Sir William Scott 1492
Prince Henry, later King Henry VIII of England 1493

16th century
Sir Edward Poynings 1509
George Nevill, 5th Baron Bergavenny (appointed, but resigned)
Sir Edward Guilford 1474/1479–1534
George Boleyn, 2nd Viscount Rochford 1534–1536
Henry FitzRoy, Duke of Richmond and Somerset
Sir Thomas Cheney 1536/1558
Arthur Plantagenet, 1st Viscount Lisle 1539–1542
Sir Thomas Seymour (temporary joint Lord Wardenship with Sir Thomas Cheney in 1545)
William Brooke, 10th Baron Cobham
Henry Brooke, 11th Baron Cobham (son of above) 1597

17th century
Henry Howard, 1st Earl of Northampton 1604–1614
Robert Carr, 1st Earl of Somerset 1614–1615
Edward, Lord Zouche of Haryngworth 1615–1625
George Villiers, 1st Duke of Buckingham 1625–1628
Theophilus Howard, 2nd Earl of Suffolk 1628–1640
James Stewart, Duke of Richmond and Lennox 1641–1642
Sir Edward Boys 1642–1646
Major John Boys 1646–1648
Sir Algernon Sydney 1648–1651
Colonel Thomas Kelsey 1651–1656
Admiral Robert Blake 1656–1657
Heneage Finch, 3rd Earl of Winchilsea 1660 (unconfirmed term; may have been father/son)
James Stuart, Duke of York and Albany 1660–1673
Colonel John Beaumont 1673–1691
Henry Sydney, 1st Earl of Romney 1691–1702

18th century
Prince George of Denmark 1702–1708
Lionel Sackville, 7th Earl of Dorset 1708–1712 (served two terms)
James Butler, 2nd Duke of Ormonde 1712–1715
John Sidney, 6th Earl of Leicester 1717–1727
Lionel Sackville, 1st Duke of Dorset 1727–1765
Robert Darcy, 4th Earl of Holderness 1765–1778
Frederick North, Lord North (2nd Earl of Guilford from 1790) 1778–1792
William Pitt the Younger 1792–1806

19th century
Robert Jenkinson, 2nd Earl of Liverpool 1806–1827
Arthur Wellesley, 1st Duke of Wellington 1829–1852
James Broun-Ramsay, 1st Marquess of Dalhousie 1853–1860
Henry Temple, 3rd Viscount Palmerston 1860–1865
Granville Leveson-Gower, 2nd Earl Granville 1865–1891 (not installed?)
William Henry Smith 1891 (not installed?)
Frederick Hamilton-Temple-Blackwood, 1st Marquess of Dufferin and Ava 1892–1895
Robert Gascoyne-Cecil, 3rd Marquess of Salisbury 1895–1903

20th century
George Curzon, 1st Baron Curzon of Kedleston 1905
The Prince George, Prince of Wales 1905–1907
Thomas Brassey, 1st Earl Brassey 1908–1913
William Lygon, 7th Earl Beauchamp 1913–1934
Rufus Isaacs, 1st Marquess of Reading 1934–1935
Freeman Freeman-Thomas, 1st Marquess of Willingdon 1936–1941
Sir Winston Churchill 1941–1965 (installed August 1946)
Sir Robert Menzies 1965–1978 (installed July 1966)
Queen Elizabeth The Queen Mother 1978–2002 (installed August 1979)

21st century
Admiral of the Fleet Michael Boyce, Baron Boyce 2004–2022 (installed April 2005)
(vacant) 2022–present

References

Further reading

External links
Official Confederation of the Cinque Ports
Cinque Ports 1155–1500
Flags of the World Website (at Main Mirror)
Additional listing from www.eastkent
Portrait of Sir Winston Churchill in uniform as Lord Warden, 1956.

Honorary titles

 
Ceremonial officers in the United Kingdom
Cinque Ports